Sunday Life may refer to:

Sunday Life (newspaper), a Sunday newspaper based in Belfast, Northern Ireland
Sunday Life (TV series), a BBC television programme